Oukoop may refer to:

 Oukoop, Utrecht
 Oukoop, South Holland